Tejera is a Spanish-language surname, meaning place of yew trees.

It may refer to:

Carolina Tejera (born 1976), Venezuelan model and actress
Domingo Tejera de Quesada (1881-1944), Spanish publisher
Domingo Tejera (1899–1969), Uruguayan footballer who played as a defender
Eusebio Tejera (1922–2002), Uruguayan footballer who played as a defender
Federico J. González Tejera (born 1964), the president and CEO of Radisson Hospitality AB
Juan Tejera (born 1983), Uruguayan footballer who plays as a centre-back or defensive midfielder
Marcelo Tejera (born 1973), former Uruguayan footballer who played as an attacking midfielder
Martín Tejera (born 1991), Uruguayan footballer who plays as a goalkeeper
Michael Tejera (born 1976), former Cuban Major League Baseball pitcher
Nivaria Tejera (born 1929), Cuban poet and novelist
Sergio Tejera (born 1990), Spanish footballer who plays as a central midfielder
Victorino Tejera Márquez (1922-2018), Spanish scholar and professor of philosophy
 Diego de la Tejera Farías (born 1995), Mexican football midfielder

See also
Teixeira, the Portuguese-language version
Tejada (disambiguation)
Tejeda (disambiguation)

Spanish-language surnames